Albert Takács (born 17 March 1955) is a Hungarian politician and jurist, who served as Minister of Justice and Law Enforcement between 2007 and 2008.

References
 MTI Ki Kicsoda 2009, Magyar Távirati Iroda Zrt., Budapest, 2008, 1082. old., ISSN 1787-288X
 Draskovics Tibor váltja Takács Albertet – MTI, 2008. február 12. 
 Az Origo cikke Takács Albert kinevezésére

1955 births
Living people
Justice ministers of Hungary